The Ankh-Morpork City Watch is the police force of the fictional city of Ankh-Morpork in the Discworld series by the English writer Terry Pratchett.

The Watch, its growth and development, and its inner workings are explored through a series of eight fantasy novels and one short story.  These novels generally feature as the protagonist, the Watch Commander Sam Vimes, and take on the general shape of a crime novel, in which the Watch are called on to solve a mysterious crime.  In order of publication, they are; Guards! Guards! (1989), "Theatre of Cruelty" (1993) (a short story), Men at Arms (1993), Feet of Clay (1996), Jingo (1997), The Fifth Elephant (1999), Night Watch (2002), Thud! (2005) and Snuff (2011).  Besides these main stories, the Watch, and individual members thereof, appear in some form in many of the other Discworld novels, especially those set in Ankh-Morpork.

The Watch is also the loose inspiration for the 2021 fantasy police procedural television series, The Watch.

Style
Pratchett's Watch has been described as part of a longstanding fantasy tradition where the characters of the city watch would "rush in and die, or run away", with Pratchett's approach to that tradition ranging from parody in the earlier novels to "deeper satire" in the later ones.

Fictional history (before the time in which the novels are set)
Note: Some of the information repeated below was taken from The Discworld Companion and the 1999 Discworld Diary, which had a City Watch theme, and has not been confirmed in any of the Discworld novels.

The "Ankh-Morpork Watch & Ward" was founded in AM 1561 by King Veltrick I. They had full copper armour and a copper shield inscribed "Fabricati Diem, Pvncti Agvnt Celeriter" ("Make the Day, the Moments Pass Quickly", Veltrick's motto). Four days later Veltrick's son assassinated him, and became Veltrick II. Since he had little interest in maintaining a police force, the equipment of the Watch quickly deteriorated.

At this time there were four separate forces:
 The "Palace Guard", who guarded the palace.
 The "Cable Street Particulars", a political police force concentrating on discovering "plots" against the current rulers of the city. The name may have been inspired by the Baker Street Irregulars from the stories of Sherlock Holmes, and perhaps by the Battle of Cable Street, a riot started between Oswald Mosley's British Union of Fascists and anti-fascist protesters in 1936. They are also known as The Unmentionables (a colloquial British term for underwear), possibly a parody of The Invincibles, an Irish extremist nationalist group, or of The Untouchables, a prohibition-era law-enforcement group, who served as government intelligence.
 The "Ward", who acted as gate-guards, thief-takers etc. during the day.
 The "Watch", who served the same purpose in the hours of darkness. The force comprised one commander, five captains, ten sergeants, forty corporals, lance-corporals, constables and lance-constables, and, in times of emergency, a "citizens militia" of varied size.

Public opinion of the Watches (the Ward became known as the Day Watch) was never high, and reached an all-time low when a Commander, who had told the public not to take the law into their own hands, was thrown onto the Ankh with a cry of "If it's not in our hands, whose hands is it in?" The Guilds were policing themselves by this point, so the Watch was becoming increasingly irrelevant.

The Watch had a brief respite in AM 1688, following the Ankh-Morpork Civil War, when Commander Suffer-Not-Injustice Vimes and his Ironheads became the city's rulers. However, after he was deposed in favour of the Patricianship, the Watch sank even further into obscurity; he was (until recently) the last Watch Commander. Under the rule of the Patricians, not only did Guild Law apply in the Guilds, but the only laws that applied anywhere else were the whims of the man in charge.

By the time of Homicidal Lord Winder's rule as Patrician, there were only a handful of Watch Houses remaining. The Cable Street Particulars were thriving, however, having changed from an intelligence agency into a secret police force, employing torture with gusto. During the Glorious Revolution of the Twenty-Fifth of May, their building was burnt down by members of the Night Watch from Treacle Mine Road. The change in Patricians did not lead to an improvement in perceptions of the Watch, and when Lord Vetinari replaced Mad Lord Snapcase, and even theft was legalised, there seemed to be no point to them at all.

The dysfunctional Night Watch now comprised three men, based in the old Treacle Mine Road Watch House. While the Day Watch had become another of the city's gangs, the Night Watch was just inactive.

History according to plot of novels 
This changed when Constable Carrot Ironfoundersson joined, and the Night Watch saved the city from a dragon. Following the destruction of their Watch House, they moved to larger premises in Pseudopolis Yard (a name reminiscent of Scotland Yard) and started recruiting more members, especially from ethnic minorities such as dwarfs, trolls and the undead. The Watch has even admitted a vampire, a werewolf, an Igor and a Nac Mac Feegle. When they saved the Patrician's life Vetinari agreed to increase the force's stature, with new Section Houses being built around the city. The remains of the Day Watch were incorporated into a new City Watch, commanded by Sam Vimes.

Since then, the Watch has become a proper police force, dealing in crime prevention and investigation, rather than simple "thief-taking". They now have a forensics section, a Traffic Division and the long-gone Cable Street Particulars have been replaced by a plain-clothes division. A Watch Academy has been set up, although watchmen trained there often get "poached" by other Sto Plains city-states who have seen the advantages such a force has. Vimes tolerates this, because it is useful that coppers all over the plains have been trained to obey him.

Another recent addition are "the Specials", based on the Watch's ancient right to establish a Citizen's Militia as needed. Known members include the Librarian (who was actually made a Special Constable long before the Militia was set up); Mr Boggis of the Thieves' Guild; Sam Vimes' butler Willikins; and a clacks operative named Andy "Two Swords" Hancock who carries a disturbing amount of weaponry.

The Watch's current motto is "FABRICATI DIEM, PVNC", as inscribed on the old Treacle Mine Road Watch House; presumably the last part of the original "Fabricati Diem, Pvncti Agvnt Celeriter" had been lost. This is nonsense in Latin, and doesn't actually mean "Make my day, punk", although it looks as though it ought to; this is the nature of most "Latatian" in the books, and is not unusual. Fred Colon insists it means "To protect and serve". The motto of the Vimes family is "Protego et servio", or "I protect and serve".

More and more watchmen trained by the City Watch prefer to work in other cities abroad where they can earn good money thanks to their outstanding qualification and ethics. They are referred to as "Sammies" (similar to "Bobbies", a term for British police officers derived from the common abbreviation of the first name of Sir Robert Peel, the man credited with the creation of the first regular, uniformed, police service in the UK) and communicate with each other by telegraph ("clacks"), a reference to real-world Interpol (mentioned in The Night Watch).

Members

The primary members of the Ankh-Morpork City Watch are (see the linked articles for full details of the characters):

His Grace, The Duke of Ankh, Commander Sir Samuel Vimes

Samuel Vimes is the Commander of the City Watch. It is all he has ever known, and he now brings the dirty tricks he learned as a street copper to his new role.
He also makes sure to pass these tricks of the trade on to new recruits.
Under Sam Vimes, the Watch has strengthened its position, making many enemies (although the Assassin's Guild no longer accept contracts). 
In his time in the Watch he has married the richest woman in Ankh-Morpork, Lady Sybil, and had a son with her, young Sam.

Captain Carrot Ironfoundersson
Adopted by dwarfs as an infant after the deaths of his human parents, Carrot grew up down in the mines of the Copperhead mountains. He is "six feet tall and nearly as broad across the shoulders". His dwarfish name is Kzad-bhat, which, roughly translated, means "Head Banger", a logical nickname for a  man living in a mine built by  dwarfs. He was quite surprised the day he was informed that he was human. His adoptive father thought that he ought to go and live amongst humans, and found him a job with the Ankh-Morpork Night Watch under the misapprehension that they were respected and respectable. Carrot was "barely 16 years old" at this time.

Carrot joined the Night Watch while it was only a small group of misfits who ran from evildoers rather than arrest them (see Guards! Guards!). He had difficulty with this attitude, as his "old-fashioned" view of justice led him to arrest the leader of the entirely legal Thieves' Guild on his first day. He since has learned to understand the city a bit better. The city learned about him as quickly when he won in a fight against every miscreant in the Mended Drum tavern, including the then-doorman Detritus the troll.

Captain Carrot has made quite a name for himself, rapidly and effortlessly coming to know all of the city's one-million population by name and tax papers. He is big on paperwork and organization and always (often to the dismay of his girlfriend and fellow officer, Angua) takes time to see all sides of a story before getting involved. When Sam Vimes planned to retire after his marriage to Lady Sybil Ramkin, Carrot was named his successor. He is not particularly skilled in comma placement and has a bit of trouble with the whole concept of "i before e". He is considered "the Disc's most linear thinker". For instance, as part of a murder investigation, he interviews Death. Carrot is also famous enough that there are action figures of him available (as seen in the novel Hogfather).

Carrot's main talents are his genuine interest in and liking for people (particularly when contrasted with his boss and friend, Sam Vimes who "doesn't like anybody") and his charisma and "supernatural likability". He is often shown to be able to get people to do things no one else could force them to do, simply by assuming that they will; for example, he has great success in his outreach programs to at-risk Ankh-Morporkian youth by treating them like boy scouts. When he directly commands someone, they find it supremely difficult to disobey (even Vimes is shown on one occasion as being susceptible to this power). However, he prefers not to utilize this extreme of his power except in dire emergencies.

Carrot is often thought of as non-threatening, which is a dangerous conclusion if you are the unlucky person who disappoints his honest nature. People think of Carrot as being simple, and the narrator will occasionally point out that this is true - however, people often make the mistake of confusing "simple" with "stupid". Carrot's simplicity is his cunning (a technique which he may have picked-up from Vimes). In Soul Music, Carrot adds supplementary questions to the quiz machine in the Mended Drum, asking players who was responsible for recent crimes and frequently making arrests as a result. Carrot often sees the bright side of life. When Angua, a werewolf, tells him that her brother Andrei is stuck in wolf form and is forced to live as a champion sheepdog, Carrot notes that he is a champion. Carrot has also promised Angua that, should she ever follow in her brother Wolfgang's murderous footsteps, he will be the one to stop her.

While it is common knowledge that Carrot is the true heir to the throne of Ankh-Morpork, he doesn't acknowledge it, and has even hidden evidence of his royal heritage. The Patrician, Havelock Vetinari, considers him useful for this reason as well as others, as it means that any attempt to start a revolution under the claim of being true heir is impossible, and that if anyone complains that only a king has the authority to do something he does, he can simply defer to Carrot.

Carrot himself never uses his royal powers or acknowledges his royal heritage. After having learned about it (Men at Arms), he confides in Vetinari that he wants the people to obey the law because it's the law, not because "Captain Carrot is good at being obeyed", and that he is content with his job of ringing a bell and yelling that all's well "provided of course that 'all is well'".

Carrot does, however on rare occasions, hint at his royal powers to make things happen. In Jingo, Lord Vetinari gives Sam Vimes the title of Duke, something only a King can do, while Carrot is present—Vetinari goes so far as to say that he "had been reminded" that Vimes could have that title. In The Fifth Elephant, when faced with the defection of most members of the Watch under Sergeant Fred Colon (then an Acting-Captain), Carrot puts his (plain and battered) royal sword on a desk in plain sight and reminds Watch members that they had taken an oath to the King, and that the King had not relieved them of it.

Carrot is a stereotypical "perfect" policeman; totally honest, law abiding and determined to be friends with everyone. People of all species can't help wanting to behave well in his presence. He has an attitude of loving everyone. His philosophy of love for everyone has caused distress for Angua. She worries that his love toward her is equal to that he gives everyone else and not special. While he would place the welfare of the public above hers (and his own), when she was in danger, he travelled to the rim of the Disc to save her.

Carrot's attitude towards his relationship is considered particularly unusual. During Jingo, Angua is kidnapped on a Klatchian ship and The Watch pursues them. Carrot does not stand at the front of the ship fraught with worry but, sensibly, gets some sleep so he will be ready to rescue her when they catch up. Although Sam Vimes and the ship's captain see the sense of this, they can't believe that someone in love could be so sensible.

In The Art of Discworld Pratchett says that Carrot has a bright future ahead of him, "should Lord Vetinari not survive the next assassination attempt". He also notes that, although most people envision Carrot as Arnold Schwarzenegger, he is actually modeled after Liam Neeson. In both the Discworld computer game and the BBC Radio production of Guards! Guards! he speaks with a Welsh accent.

Captain Angua von Überwald
Captain Delphine Angua von Überwald first appeared in Men at Arms. Angua is a member of the Ankh-Morpork City Watch, originally hired as part of an affirmative action plan by Havelock Vetinari. Her physical beauty led colleagues to predict that criminals would be lining up to be arrested by her, but Angua's surprising strength and tough attitude soon made her one of the most feared officers on the Watch. Angua is a werewolf, though she maintains a strict vegetarian diet during her human phase and only eats chickens during her wolf phase, for which she leaves discreet payments afterwards.  

In the 1999 computer game Discworld Noir, and the 2001 books-on-tape version of Men at Arms, her name is pronounced "An-gyoo-uh" with a hard "g". Terry Pratchett writes on the terrypratchettbooks.com forum: "it's Ang as in Anger, u as in you, a as in a thing".

Angua comes from a family of werewolves. She is the daughter of a Baron and Baroness of Überwald, and has two brothers, Wolfgang and Andrei. Her sister, Elsa, is deceased, killed by Wolfgang, who disguised it as an accident. Both Andrei and Elsa were "Yennorks", werewolves that are stuck in one form (Andrei always appeared to be a wolf, and Elsa a human). Angua and Wolfgang are the only children in their family with shape-shifting ability, known as "bi-morphs". Wolfgang is extremely violent and enjoys killing, even eating, "inferior" humans. Angua, partially in reaction to what Wolfgang did to their sister, rebels against the traditional werewolf lifestyle of her parents and brother and leaves Überwald. Andrei manages to slip away as well and enjoys a career as a talented sheep herder.

After moving to Ankh-Morpork, Angua soon became the first woman to join the ranks of the City Watch. She met Corporal Carrot Ironfoundersson in the Watch, and the two soon fell in love. Since recovering from his initial surprise (which involved drawing his sword), Carrot has not seemed bothered by the fact that Angua is a werewolf. However, Angua often worries that their different backgrounds and needs will eventually doom the relationship.

One of Angua's closest friends in the Watch is Cheery Littlebottom the dwarf. In Feet of Clay, Angua helps encourage Cheery to "come out" as a woman (dwarf society expects both male and female dwarves to behave in an indistinguishable way), even lending her dresses and make-up. At the same time, Angua conceals her true nature as a werewolf from Cheery because she knows her new friend hates and fears werewolves. Throughout the book Angua debates with herself over whether it would be best to just return to Überwald and live among other werewolves. In the end, she decides to stay in Ankh-Morpork.

Angua has also made friends with Gaspode, a matty, hairy canine who gained and lost the talent of human speech in Moving Pictures. He then regains it by the time of Men at Arms by sleeping too near the Unseen University's High-Energy Magic building. Gaspode flirts with Angua constantly and has helped her out on missions many times.

In The Fifth Elephant, Watch Commander Sam Vimes is sent to Überwald on a diplomatic mission. Lord Vetinari chooses Angua to be a member of the Watch team that will accompany him, but Angua has already left for Überwald on business of her own. Carrot, assisted by Gaspode the dog, sets out after her. This is the first Discworld book to reveal much about Angua's background, and her parents and brother Wolfgang all figure in the story. Angua's relationship with actual wolves also provides much tension. Wolfgang plays a significant role as the leader of a violent werewolf movement in Überwald. Ultimately, Vimes kills Wolfgang in a violent confrontation in the city square. Angua is gratified to hear this, as Wolfgang threatened her and anything she cared for while he remained alive.

The fact that the Watch now has a werewolf has become common knowledge throughout Ankh-Morpork, but that hasn't affected Angua's privacy substantially, as, for obvious reasons, it is generally assumed to be Nobby Nobbs; Carrot, Vimes, Vetinari and Angua herself all play along, mostly rather amused. However, in The Truth, it is revealed in passing that several members of the Ankh-Morpork aristocracy, as well as the lawyer Mr Slant, are well aware of her nature, and in Making Money, Moist von Lipwig also figures this out upon seeing Angua in her werewolf form with Nobby standing beside her and recognizing her hair. Though the widespread recognition of the werewolf presence in the Watch has not inconvenienced Angua on a human level, it has led to a growing sophistication within the city's criminal underworld in evading capture. The first recorded use of a scent bomb is by The New Firm (Mr. Pin and Mr. Tulip) in The Truth. Several references to scent bombs have been made since, most notably their usage by Carcer, at the beginning of Night Watch, when he killed Sergeant Stronginthearm.

Angua assists Vimes in another diplomatic mission in Monstrous Regiment, and is mentioned in Going Postal as being difficult for criminals in Ankh-Morpork to avoid. Angua also appears in a supporting role in Thud!, where she gains a rival in the form of the Watch's first vampire officer, Sally. Angua is an extremely practical and level-headed person. While not as cynical as Commander Sam Vimes, she balances out Carrot's naïveté (although she occasionally wonders if he's really as innocent as he appears). In human form, Angua is a strict vegetarian. In wolf form, she has a tendency to go after chickens, but she is always careful to go back and slip some money under the door the next day.

Though she is deeply committed to Carrot, even likening herself to being his dog (or as she puts it in Jingo, a wolf that lives with humans) it hasn't stopped others with romantic interest; there is tension with a wolf named Gavin in The Fifth Elephant, and she receives a marriage proposal from the small mutt Mr. Fusspot in Making Money.

In the events of I Shall Wear Midnight it is noted that Angua has been newly promoted to Captain. Captain Carrot arrests Tiffany Aching after a disturbance in the King's Head involving the Nac Mac Feegles, who are defeated by Wee Mad Arthur, another Feegle (the rat catcher from Feet of Clay who rescues Sgt Colon from the King Golem, although he was referred to as a gnome in the original novel). Wee Mad Arthur has now joined the watch, and he tells Tiffany that she shall be escorted by his colleague, Captain Angua. Subsequent ("main" as opposed to young-adult) novels also refer to her by this rank.

In the 2010 Sky television adaptation of Going Postal, Angua was played by Ingrid Bolsø Berdal.

The Cretaceous gymnosperm species Czekanowskia anguae is named after Angua.

Sergeant Fred Colon
Frederick "Fred" Colon is a sergeant, and appears to have been so for a long time. May have been first mentioned in The Colour of Magic as "a Sergeant of The Watch" who enters the then Broken Drum. He is described on several occasions as "one of nature's sergeants". He is overweight, preferring to avoid trouble and exertion, and rather unimaginative. When not on desk duty (a post he gets more often than other sergeants, due to being responsible for working out the rota), he generally "guards" bridges or large buildings against theft. He was a corporal in the Watch at the time Sam Vimes first joined, and subsequent to this spent some time in the army (the Duke of Quirm's Middleweight Infantry and then the Duke of Eorle's First Heavy Infantry), before returning to the Watch.

In The Fifth Elephant, Colon became the head of the Traffic Squad, which also included his best friend Nobby Nobbs. This role perfectly fit the above described qualities, especially as the Traffic Squad is "self-financing" (i.e. they keep the fines). A brief promotion to acting-captain proved a disaster as everyone, including Colon himself, expected. He is currently holding dual position of Custody Officer and Watch Liaison Officer; jobs so vague that no one is entirely sure what they entail, least of all Colon himself; they serve the dual purpose of preventing his brain from becoming overburdened with responsibility and avoiding the catastrophic possibility that he might be given a task of any real importance. His office, in a separate building from the main watch house, is frequented by old acquaintances who want somewhere quiet to get away from the wife, hear what's happening on the street and—in Vimes' words—"gossip like washerwomen." For this free-flowing source of information, Vimes considers the cost of doughnuts on an expense voucher a very favourable trade.

Closer examination, though, shows that Colon has some hidden depths. As Vimes thought it, most of the other watch officers saw a fat, stupid, lazy, cowardly man and that was mostly what was there, but Colon and Nobby have a street-level knowledge of Ankh-Morpork on a par with Vimes and are good at sensing tension in a crowd. Both are also survivors of the Glorious 25 May when, as described in Night Watch, in the aftermath of a coup an assortment of regular police and hangers-on (including an apprentice Assassin called Vetinari) took out, at some cost, the hard-line remnants of the outgoing regime's secret police. Colon also performs his duties in Thud! fairly well. He is an amiable jailer, and bright enough to keep the keys in a closed tin box in the bottom drawer of his desk, well out of reach of anything an inmate would be able to use. He is often portrayed as being prejudiced against "minority," even in the Watch, such as dwarves, undead, "foreigners," or even women. However, his prejudice is so non-specific and naive (and frequently short-lived when actually exposed to the group in question) that nobody takes it seriously.

He is possibly related to Sergeant Doppelpunkt (German for "colon", as in the punctuation mark), one half of the town watch in Bad Blintz, Überwald, seen in The Amazing Maurice and his Educated Rodents. Other Discworld characters with a notable similarity to Colon include a member of the guard in the Überwald town of Bonk (who was nicknamed "Colonesque" by Samuel Vimes) and one of the market guards in Al Khali, Klatch. Like the various Dibblers, this may be due to morphic resonance.

Colon is married, though his wife works during the day; since he works at night, the two seldom see each other and instead communicate by leaving notes. Vimes even goes as far as to privately attribute the longevity of Fred's marriage to this fact. In Guards! Guards! it is noted they have a number of children, a fact which Vimes puts down to 'persuasive handwriting'.

Colon made a brief appearance in the Cosgrove Hall adaptation of Soul Music. In the BBC Radio 4 adaptation of Guards! Guards! he was voiced by Stephen Thorne. In the 1988 stage play he was played by Roger Bingham. In the Radio 4 adaptation of Night Watch, he was voiced by Sam Dale.

Corporal Nobby Nobbs
Cecil Wormsborough St. John "Nobby" Nobbs is untidy, smelly, and about the same height as a dwarf. Because of this and the fact that he is extremely ugly, he carries a certificate signed by the Patrician to prove that, on the testimony of his parents and the midwife who delivered him, he is, on the balance of probabilities, a human being.  A running joke is the inability of others to believe this, despite—or even because of—the evidence. In fact, in Hogfather, even Death himself was unable to discern Nobby's species. According to the blurb of Men At Arms, Nobby was "disqualified from the human race for shoving". He always seems to have a cigarette butt about him, normally stowed behind his ear.

Samuel Vimes is Nobby's commanding officer, and Sergeant Fred Colon his partner and longtime friend. Together, Nobby and Colon have managed to have many strangely philosophical (or just strange) conversations, including one on whether Death has a first name, or even any friends to call him it. Oddly enough, these conversations hint at Nobby being more intelligent than Colon, with Nobby continually pointing out fatal flaws in Colon's statements and arguments, and Colon mentally scrambling to come up with an answer (this is not unlike some of the byplay in the Laurel and Hardy films). Nobby is fond of folk dancing.

As a child he was a street urchin and a major source of information for various city notables. His father was abusive, and broke his leg at least once (Vimes notes in Night Watch that Nobby used to have his arms broken by his father too—and in Hogfather, Nobby claims that he never got anything in his stocking ... except once, when his father vomited into it). The young Nobby sometimes refers to his father as "Number One Suspect", and is afraid of going to prison because his father is currently in there. He was apparently inspired to join the Watch after meeting with Sergeant-At-Arms John Keel (or alternatively Sam Vimes, due to time travel), who once gave him a spoon (which his father subsequently stole upon being released from prison).

Nobby was once thought to be the Earl of Ankh, but it was all a charade to make him king as he would be easier to manipulate than the 'real' heir in the form of Captain Carrot. Nobby proved less tractable than the conspirators had expected, turning down a cushy life as figurehead ruler of Ankh-Morpork largely, by his own account, for fear of what Vimes would have to say—or more importantly, do—when he found out given his and his infamous ancestor's opinions on royalty. It was also due to his family's long-standing belief that they should never volunteer for anything as there is always going to be a catch. Indeed, he fled the offer at a dead run, all the time terrified Vimes would "go spare". However, at the end of the book Feet of Clay, it is also suggested that he may be a real nobleman, due to the amount of family heirlooms he has not mentioned to any other person (and his small stature and odd physical features may be a jab at the inbreeding amongst royal bloodlines). On the other hand, the Nobbses have stolen so much stuff over the years that, as Vimes has said, "you could probably prove Nobby was the Dowager Duchess of Quirm".

Nobby played a role in the resolution of the "war" between Ankh-Morpork and the empire of Klatch in Jingo, and in recognition the Patrician gave him a new job in traffic control. He has since been "promoted" to assistant to the Watch Liaison Officer (in other words Fred Colon), a job vague enough to ensure he never has to do anything actually important.

Ironically it is also Nobby who ends the war between the dwarves and the trolls. In Thud it is revealed that the Battle of Koom Valley, the main reason for the continuing hatred between those two races, was not supposed to be a war at all but a chance for the Kings of each side to discuss peace. This information is contained in an ancient artifact called a Cube. Nobby, who has been set up as a petty thief from the start, finds and steals the Cube at some point in the book, although we do not find this out until Vimes tells him to hand it over. Vimes works out how to make the Cube play its message, in the presence of the current King of the Dwarves, and the truth of Koom Valley is heard for the first time in hundreds of years.

He believes he is in a romantic relationship with Verity "Hammerhead" Pushpram, a girl who runs a fish stall and gets her nickname from the fact that her eyes appear to be looking in opposite directions. However, this "relationship" seems to consist solely of her hitting him with a fish and telling him to bugger off. He remains "faithful" to her, however, in all books except Thud!, in which he is temporarily in a relationship with exotic dancer Tawneee. As of the events of Snuff, he appears to be in a romantic relationship with Shine of the Rainbow, a goblin girl, and it is tacitly suggested that Nobby may have some Goblin in his ancestry, explaining why nobody could be sure of his humanity. This relationship is confirmed in "Raising Steam", when Colon refers to Nobby being "practically married", in reference to his own marital arguments with Mrs Colon.

He is possibly related to Corporal Knopf (as Knopf can be translated as knob), one half of the town watch in Bad Blintz, Überwald, seen in The Amazing Maurice and his Educated Rodents. Other Discworld characters with a notable similarity to Nobby include a member of the guard in the Überwald town of Bonk, who was nicknamed "Nobbski" by Vimes, and one of the market guards in Al Khali, Klatch. Like the various Dibblers, this may be due to morphic resonance. Despite this, being related to Nobby is not seen as a good thing in Ankh Morpork. One of the Unseen University bedlows who, by sheer coincidence, shared the same last name as Nobby was incredibly swift to denounce any potential ties of family.

According to the Pratchett Portfolio, his typical saying is "'tis a lie sir, I never done it" (like all other "typical sayings" in the Portfolio (except that of the Death of Rats) he has not actually been recorded saying it).

During Nobby's time in Klatch he "got in touch with his feminine side", and is quite fond of wearing women's clothing. This can occasionally be useful, as he dressed up as an old lady as part of a Traffic scam before being stopped by Vimes.

Nobby made a brief appearance in the Cosgrove Hall adaptation of Soul Music. In the BBC Radio 4 adaptation of Guards! Guards! he was voiced by Melvyn Hayes. In the 1988 stageplay he was played by David Brett, formerly of the Flying Pickets. Nobby has also appeared in two computer adventure games, Discworld (The Trouble With Dragons) (where he was voiced by Tony Robinson) and Discworld Noir (where he was voiced by Rob Brydon). In both cases Nobby had a distinct Irish accent. In the 2006 TV adaptation of Hogfather he was played by Nicolas Tennant.

Sergeant Detritus

Sergeant Cheery Littlebottom
See Dwarfs (Discworld)

Constable Reginald Shoe
See: Undead (Discworld)

Lance-Constable Salacia "Sally" von Humpeding
See Undead (Discworld)

Constable Dorfl
See: Golems (Discworld)

Constable Visit-the-Infidel/Ungodly-with-Explanatory-Pamphlets
Visit-the-Infidel-with-Explanatory-Pamphlets (sometimes referred to as Visit-the-Ungodly-with-Explanatory-Pamphlets) is a Constable of the City Watch. He is generally just called "Constable Visit", or occasionally by his nickname "Washpot". The term comes from one of Visit's favourite quotations, "Moab is my washpot. Over Edom will I cast out my shoe", from Psalm 60 in The Book of Om. His name is, apparently, shorter in Omnian.

He first appeared in Feet of Clay. He is referred to by Pratchett as follows: "There's one in every station, and Constable Visit was enough for two." Samuel Vimes says he is a good copper, his highest form of personal praise. He is an Omnian of a gentle but determined proselytising nature. He can clear a large crowd in seconds, just by talking to them about religion and threatening them with pamphlets, principally Unadorned Facts and Battle Call (parodies of The Plain Truth and The War Cry).

In off-duty moments, he goes door to door with his fellow Omnian, Smite-the-Unbeliever-with-Cunning-Arguments. Entire pubs have been known to draw the curtains, turn off the lights and lie on the floor whimpering at news of his coming down the street. The only "entity" not afraid of Visit's endless proselytising is his friend and fellow constable Dorfl, a golem with endless patience and a desire to argue faith rationally.

He appears in the SkyOne television adaptation of Hogfather, portrayed by Richard Katz.

Inspector A E Pessimal
A E Pessimal was first the government Inspector of the Watch assigned (in Thud!) by Lord Vetinari to inspect the Watch and judge whether the Watch gave fair value for the civic funds it used ("who watches the watchmen?") and to inspect the Unseen University in A Collegiate Casting-Out of Devilish Devices.

He is described as a neat little man, with very shiny shoes, and has no friends and no sense of humour. He does not have a first name, as others would understand; he was "initialled" at birth rather than named.
He was in a position to seriously inconvenience Vimes with difficult questions such as; "Why is C.W.St.J. 'Nobby' Nobbs in the Watch? Are you aware you employ a petty criminal?"

Eventually, Vimes decided to shake the man up, and swore him in as a special constable for the duration of an impending street fight of roughly a thousand trolls and dwarves. Vimes thought he could scare the man while showing him what it was like to be a copper. Instead, A E took his position seriously, to the point of bare-handedly attacking and trying to bite a troll who took a swing at Vimes. This action remains one of the few events to have totally shocked Vetinari, when he heard about it in Vimes' report ("Mr Pessimal? Mr. A E Pessimal? We are talking about the same person? Small man, very clean shoes?").

A short while later, A E came to Vimes' office and was offered the position of Lance-Constable and adjutant, with an estimate that he could be a Sergeant in a year. Vimes' reason for taking A E on was A E's patience and intelligence; Vimes needed someone who could look through paperwork and understand what was being said by sifting out important or suspicious facts. Vimes reasons that A E always wanted to be a Watchman and was stopped by his weak stature. As a condition of his employment, A E was told that he would go on patrol twice a week, so he would be able to learn what's important. A E is also one of the few people Vimes allows to call him "Mister Vimes", saying that the man "earned it all in one go". Along with Vimes' Dis-Organizer Mark Five ("The Gooseberry"), it would seem that A E is the start to a new department in the City Watch.

By the events of Snuff, A E has risen to the newly minted rank of Inspector in the City Watch, and his forensic accounting has become legendary and feared throughout Ankh-Morpork, as people fear what he may uncover in their financial records.

Constable Igor
Igor is an Igor who was considered "too modern" for Überwald by his family, and went with Samuel Vimes to Ankh-Morpork. He specialises in genetic experiments ("bio-artificing"), which, on the Discworld, involves really small stitches. His creations include a pet rabbit called Eerie, a particularly suitable name as he grows spare human ears on it (a reference to the human ear equipped mouse of 1995, a few years prior to the creation of the book). Another early experiment was breeding noses, which act as independent lifeforms until sewn on.  He also experimented with swimming potatoes in the hopes of breeding instant Fish & Chips. As with all Igors, Constable Igor is highly talented at performing transplant surgery.

He has a speech "impediment" in that he sometimes forgets to lisp. Vimes employs him because of his surgery methods, which Vimes considered to be considerably more advanced than most of Ankh-Morpork's doctors. Igor first appeared in the novel The Fifth Elephant.  Along with Sergeant Cheery Littlebottom, Constable Igor is a member of the Watch's small Forensics dept.

Constable Downspout
Constable Downspout, who first appears in Feet of Clay, is a surveillance expert for the Watch. Being a gargoyle, he is capable of remaining motionless in one spot and watching for days at a time, a "world champion at not moving" as Vimes once put it. He has no use for money and instead receives his salary in pigeons, which he eats.

Corporal Buggy Swires
A gnome. Introduced in Jingo (possibly in The Light Fantastic; there was a gnome identified only as Swires), Buggy possesses the hard-nosed, bellicose personality typical of his species, proving able to shout down uncooperative witnesses despite being only six inches tall. He has since established himself as the sole member of the Watch's Airborne Section (with the possible exception of Wee Mad Arthur) through his ability to tame various species of bird (most recently a buzzard, acquired from the Pictsies for a crate of whisky) to act as transport, for reconnaissance and messaging purposes.

Notes

References

External links
 Discworld & Pratchett Wiki

Discworld characters
Discworld organisations
Fictional law enforcement agencies